Sings the Movies is a studio album from Shirley Bassey released in 1995.

In 1995 Shirley Bassey signed a deal with the PolyGram TV label, she recorded and released two albums with the label. The first was a themed album of movie songs. The songs were personally selected by Bassey for the album, and are a diverse range of ballads and pop classics, some were originally composed for original soundtracks, but several were classic songs that appeared in successful movies. One re-recording was made of the classic James Bond theme "Goldfinger", this is the fourth studio recording of the song by Shirley Bassey. No singles were issued from this album. 
Several TV performances were made by Bassey to promote this album and British television broadcast a successful commercial campaign. The album sold well across Europe and entered the UK Albums Chart, for a run of nine weeks, on November 11, 1995, peaked at No. 24, and earned a gold disc.

Track listing
 "Goldfinger" (John Barry, Leslie Bricusse, Anthony Newley) from the movie Goldfinger
 "Crazy" (Willie Nelson) from the movie Coal Miner's Daughter
 "Arthur's Theme (Best That You Can Do)" (Christopher Cross, Burt Bacharach, Carole Bayer Sager, Peter Allen) from the film Arthur
 "Love on the Rocks"  (Neil Diamond, Gilbert Bécaud) from the movie The Jazz Singer
 "Eleanor Rigby" (Paul McCartney, John Lennon) from the movie Yellow Submarine
 "Let's Stay Together" (Al Green) from the movie Pulp Fiction
 "The Rose" (Amanda McBroom) from the movie The Rose
 "We Don't Need Another Hero" (Terry Britten, Graham Lyle) from the movie Mad Max Beyond Thunderdome
 "Do You Know Where You're Going To" (Michael Masser, Gerald Goffin) from the movie Mahogany
 "It Must Have Been Love" (Per Gessle) from the movie Pretty Woman
 "Try a Little Tenderness" (Irving King, Harry M. Woods) from the movie The Commitments
 "Hopelessly Devoted to You" (John Farrar) from the movie Grease
 "Makin' Whoopee" (Walter Donaldson, Gus Kahn) from the movie Sleepless in Seattle
 "Who Wants to Live Forever" (Brian May) from the movie Highlander

References 

Shirley Bassey albums
1995 albums
Covers albums